My Friend, Kolka! is a Soviet 1961 drama film directed by Aleksei Saltykov  and Aleksander Mitta.

Plot

Kolka Snegeryov is bored at school along the other children. The work of the pioneer organization turned into a monotonous routine. The senior Pioneer leader  Lydia Mikhajlovna's work seems good. But behind accurately made plans are formalism, indifference and boredom. Declaring boycott, children  organize  a secret society which has the acronym ТОТР – "To help offended and weak ". New pioneer leader supports children and carries away their greater and interesting business.

Cast
Aleksandr Kobozev	 - 	Kolka Snegiryov
Anna Rodionova	- 	Masha Kanareikina
Alexey Borzunov	- 	Yura Ustinov
Viktor Onuchak	- 	        Fedya Drankin
Tatyana Kuznetsova	-	Klava Ogorodnikova
Antonina Dmitriyeva -	Ivanova
Anatoly Kuznetsov	- 	Rudenko
Vitali Ovanesov	- 	Valeri Novikov
Lidiya Chernyshyova- 	Novikova
Boris Novikov	- 	Kuzma
Igor Kosukhin	-	Isayev
Savely Kramarov	- 	Pimen
 Valery Ryzhakov	-	schoolboy
Anatoli Eliseev		
Yuri Nikulin	-	Vaska
Yevgeni Teterin	- 	School Principal
Svetlana Kharitonova	- 	Evgeniya Petrovna
Aleksandr Lebedev	- 	Pioneer Leader from School #23
Oleg Vidov

References

External links
 

Mosfilm films
1960s Russian-language films
1961 drama films
1961 films
Films directed by Alexey Saltykov
Films directed by Alexander Mitta
Soviet teen films